Narayan Shrestha (Nepali: नारायण श्रेष्ठ) is a radio and television personality from Nepal, known for hosting the talk show BBC Sajha Sawal.

References

Year of birth missing (living people)
Living people
Radio in Nepal
Nepali radio presenters